Rago is an unincorporated community in Washington County, Colorado, United States.

Notes

Unincorporated communities in Washington County, Colorado
Unincorporated communities in Colorado